The 2022 K4 League is the third season of the K4 League as a semi-professional league and the fourth tier of South Korean football league system. Pocheon Citizen are the defending champions and was promoted together with Siheung Citizen (the runner-up) and Dangjin Citizen (play-off winner) to 2022 K3 League. Pyeongtaek Citizen were relegated from 2021 K3 League and will play in the K4 League for the first time.

Competition format 
The 2022 K4 League is contested by 17 teams, with no relegation system in place. Each team competes home and away, playing 32 games. The top two teams get promoted to the K3 League, while the third and the fourth placed teams qualify for the promotion play-off.

Promotion and relegation
Teams relegated from the 2021 K3 League
 Pyeongtaek Citizen

Teams promoted to the 2022 K3 League
 Pocheon Citizen
 Siheung Citizen
 Dangjin Citizen

Dissolved team from 2022 K4 League
 Goyang Citizen FC (Expelled from K4 League by Korean Football Association.)
 FC Namdong (Dissolved on 1 August 2022 during season 2022)

Teams

League table

Results

Matches 1 to 34

Promotion play-off
The match will be played on 5 November 2022. The 3rd and 4th placed team from the 2022 K4 League will play for a spot in the 2023 K3 League against the team placed 16th in the 2022 K3 League.

Promotion play-off

Promotion–relegation play-off

Winner

See also
 2022 Korean FA Cup
 2022 K League 1
 2022 K League 2
 2022 K3 League

References

External links

K4 League seasons
2022 in South Korean football